The Parliament of the Czech Republic vote of no confidence in the current Czech Republic government of the Prime Minister Bohuslav Sobotka was held on Tuesday 26 May 2015.

The vote was initiated because of opposition concerns about conflicts of interest on the part of Finance Minister Andrej Babiš.

The vote of no confidence was called by the three opposition political parties - ODS, TOP 09 and Úsvit (Dawn) on 21 May 2015 as step against Finance Minister of the Czech Republic Andrej Babiš.

Result 
The vote of no confidence to the Government was unsuccessful as only 47 legislators supported no confidence when 101 were needed. 105 Members of Parliament voted against no confidence and 32 MP's abstained. 16 legislators did not attend the meeting of the Chamber of Deputies.

References

2015 in the Czech Republic
Politics of the Czech Republic
Motions of no confidence